Cytochrome b is a protein that in humans is encoded by the MT-CYB gene. Its gene product is a subunit of the respiratory chain protein ubiquinol–cytochrome c reductase (UQCR, complex III or cytochrome bc1 complex), which consists of the products of one mitochondrially encoded gene, MT-CYB (mitochondrial cytochrome b), and ten nuclear genes—UQCRC1, UQCRC2, CYC1, UQCRFS1 (Rieske protein), UQCRB, "11kDa protein", UQCRH (cyt c1 Hinge protein), Rieske protein presequence, "cyt c1 associated protein", and Rieske-associated protein.

Structure 
The MT-CYB gene is located on the p arm of mitochondrial DNA in position 12 and spans 1,140 base pairs. The gene produces a 42.7 kDa protein named cytochrome b composed of 380 amino acids. Cytochrome b is an integral membrane protein with hydrophobic properties. The catalytic core of the enzyme is composed of eight transmembrane helices, the iron-sulfur protein, and cytochrome c1. Cytochrome b is a fundamental component of the ubiquinol-cytochrome c reductase complex (complex III or cytochrome b-c1 complex) that is part of the mitochondrial respiratory chain. The b-c1 complex mediates electron transfer from ubiquinol to cytochrome c. The structure of the complex is a symmetric homodimer. It is composed of eleven structural subunits, including one mitochondrial genome encoded cytochrome b and ten other nucleus encoded subunits. These subunits include three respiratory subunits (MT-CYB, CYC1 and UQCRFS1), two core proteins (UQCRC1 and UQCRC2) and six low-molecular weight proteins (UQCRH/QCR6, UQCRB/QCR7, UQCRQ/QCR8, UQCR10/QCR9, UQCR11/QCR10 and a cleavage product of UQCRFS1). The total molecular mass of the complex is about 450 kDa.

Function 
The mitochondrial cytochrome b is fundamental for the assembly and function of Complex III of the mitochondrial respiratory chain. Complex III is responsible for the catalysis of electron transfer from coenzyme Q to cytochrome c in the mitochondrial respiratory chain by translocating protons concomitantly across the inner membrane of the mitochondria. The transfer of electrons then contributes to the generation of a proton gradient across the mitochondrial membrane that is then used for ATP synthesis.

Clinical significance 
Mutations in MT-CYB can result in mitochondrial deficiencies and associated disorders. It is majorly associated with a complex III deficiency, a deficiency in an enzyme complex which catalyzes electron transfer from coenzyme Q to cytochrome c in the mitochondrial respiratory chain. A complex III deficiency can result in a highly variable phenotype depending on which tissues are affected. Most frequent clinical manifestations include progressive exercise intolerance and cardiomyopathy. Occasional multisystem disorders accompanied by exercise intolerance may arise as well, in forms of deafness, mental retardation, retinitis pigmentosa, cataract, growth retardation, and epilepsy. Other phenotypes include mitochondrial encephalomyopathy, mitochondrial myopathy, Leber hereditary optic neuropathy, muscle weakness, myoglobinuria, blood acidosis, renal tubulopathy, and more. Complex III deficiency is known to be rare among mitochondrial diseases and may follow a maternal or mendelian mode of inheritance due to its duality of genetic origin.

References

Further reading 

 
 
 
 
 
 
 
 
 
 
 
 
 
 
 
 
 
 
 
 

Mitochondrial proteins
Human mitochondrial genes